Baronnie de Coussergues is a family winery in Montblanc, Hérault, France, 
It raises vines on the grounds of Château de Coussergues, the estate covering over 620 hectares of which 120 are vineyards. 

The production include white, red and rosé wines, they are wines of blend grape varieties or high in oak.

See also 
List of oldest companies
Henokiens

References 
Article contains translated text from Baronnie de Coussergues on French Wikipedia retrieved on 25 February 2017.

External links 
Homepage

Wineries of France
Companies established in the 15th century
15th-century establishments in France